Zen Pencils is an online showcase of cartoonist Gavin Aung Than's comic strips, which feature illustrations taking on famous quotations and making a visual style to create a story, shown along with the quotes. Zen Pencils focuses on adding to renown quotes being developed into visual metaphors to make insightful comics for the public. The site was first launched in February 2012 and is based in Melbourne, Victoria, Australia.

History 
Zen Pencils was launched in 2012, by Gavin Aung Than, a professional graphic designer and a freelance cartoonist based in Melbourne, Australia. Producing comic strips for The Sunday Times, Herald Sun, mX Newspaper and Daily Telegraph, his most famous being "Dan and Pete", a comedic superhero comic strip that told the adventures of Dan "The world's greatest superhero" and his best friend Pete.

The comic was a combination of Aung Than's enjoyment of Superhero comics, cartoons, scifi, animated films, etc.) and 'Boys will be boys' (a comedic dating and relationship comic strips for the older audience, surrounding the "various dating adventures" of two brothers, Pete and Teddy and the subjects of sex, love, films and current events.) During his spare time, Aung Than would look up and read biographies of famous people, their stories, unique point of views and quotes, that lead him to create the blog Zen Pencils.

After eight years, in 2011, Aung Than resigned from his previous job to work on freelancing full-time and to focus on his passion of cartooning. During this time, the constant supply of passages and statements from renowned artists, poets, comedians, world leaders and religious representatives had led Aung Than to create the showcase blog.  "The idea of taking these inspiring quotes, combining them with my love of drawing and sharing them with others led to the creation of Zen Pencils."

As of 2015, Zen Pencils has been renown across the world, and seen as successful work leading to Aung Than being given interviews from new blog such as The Washington Post, Huffington Post, Kotaku, etc. Aung Than has attended and given speeches at Chris Guillebeau's World Domination Summit and San Diego Comic Con. As of 2014, the published, official Zen Pencils book containing the collection of the optimum comics posted on the site, on paper back had a book signing tour in Australia and has become New York Times best seller #7.

Style
Aung Than's illustrations are a cartoony comic narrative, that often mix and match simplistic character and background designs to more high detail illustrations. Often when focusing on a fellow artist's quote, a special homage comic is made to mimic other establish styles such as Bill Watterson's "Calvin and Hobbes", with Aung Than's "A cartoonist's advice". Shapes drawn in the comics, from the people to objects, are often both drawn curved, simplistic and clean, and highly detailed in either extreme closeups or establishing shots.

Form in the comics always using the environment to tell the story as well as the characters. To either establish the isolation or the doom of the situation. Throughout most of Aung Than's comic strips, he uses a realistic colour scheme in people and backgrounds. Only in certain comics does it differ, such as "Around the corner" and "Ask yourself" where the protagonists colour scheme contrasts from other people and the backgrounds entirely.

Techniques

 Establish an idea for the scenes in the comic, from reenacting a famous event, everyday occurrence or imaginative journey, via the quotes's subject matter
 Thumbnail drawings to "attempt to flesh the idea out into a proper story"
 Once plotted, start to draw out the panels and rough sketches
 Search for reference pictures to help with drawing and the environments
 Start more detailed "loose and fast" pencil sketches
 Further refine and flesh out the sketches
 Ink the outlines, remove underlined sketches and imperfections
 Color in the panels from the colour of the shirt to the contrast of shadows.

Achievements
In November 2014, Andrews McMeel published the book collection Zen Pencils: Volume 1, released containing a majority of Aung Than'''s comics on paperback. Several of the comics had to be removed from printing such as the quotes from Bill Watterson and Carl Sagan, due to the original authors declining to have their work in the collection. It has been announced that Zen Pencils: Volume 2 - Dream the Impossible Dream'', was released in October 2015.

References

External links 

Australian webcomics
2010s webcomics
2012 comics debuts